Asociación Deportiva América is a Panamanian football team.

It was founded on September 22, 2000 and is based in Bugaba. They have played in the 2009 Panamanian Third Division.

Stadium
Their home stadium is Estadio Vitelio Ortega, which is located in Divalá, Alanje District.

References

Football clubs in Panama
Association football clubs established in 2000
2000 establishments in Panama